Cattleya purpurata, known in the past as Laelia purpurata and Sophronitis purpurata, is native to Brazil where it is very popular among orchid growers. It is an epiphyte that is found in the canopy of tall trees near coastal areas, in the Brazilian states of Rio Grande do Sul, Santa Catarina and São Paulo. The orchid favors bright light and cool to warm conditions and is relative easy to cultive. C. purpurata has been used extensively as a parent in hybridizing with Cattleyas. Cattleya purpurata blooms from late spring to fall with three to five flowers on a spike. The flowers are long-lasting and fragrant.

Horticultural forms 
 C. purpurata  f. alba; white lip, sepals and petals
 C. purpurata f. carnea; pink lip, white sepals and petals
 C. purpurata f. flammea; magenta lip, pink sepals and white petals
 C. purpurata f. oculata; purple patches on lip, white sepals and petals
 C. purpurata f. roxo-violeta;  light reddish purple lip, white sepals and petals
 C. purpurata f. rubra;  magenta lip, pink sepals and petals
 C. purpurata f. sanguinea;  magenta lip, sepals and petals
 C. purpurata f. striata;  magenta lip, pink vein pattern sepals and petals
 C. purpurata f. vagnota;  dark red lip, white sepals and petals
 C. purpurata f. vinicolor;  dark red lip with small white patch at the end, white sepals and petals
 C. purpurata f. werkhaeuserii;  light bluish lip, white sepals and petals

Hybrids 
Cattleya × elegans is a hybrid orchid with a formula hybridae Cattleya purpurata (Lindl. & Paxton) Van den Berg (2008) × Cattleya tigrina A.Rich. (1848). It is found in South and South-East Brazil.

References

External links

 Cattleya purpurata = Laelia purpurata. The Internet Orchid Species Photo Encyclopedia
 Cattleya purpurata At Tropicos.org. Missouri Botanical Garden.

purpurata
purpurata
Epiphytic orchids
Orchids of Brazil
Garden plants
Taxa named by John Lindley
Taxa named by Joseph Paxton